Jamshedpur East Assembly constituency   is one of the assembly constituencies which make up Jamshedpur Lok Sabha seat in  the Indian state of Jharkhand.

Overview  
According to the Delimitation of Parliamentary and Assembly Constituencies Order, 2008 of the Election Commission of India, Jamshedpur East Assembly constituency covers ward numbers 20 and 23 to 40 in Jamshdepur Notified Area. Jamshedpur East {Vidhan Sabha constituency) is a part of Jamshedpur (Lok Sabha constituency).

Members of Legislative Assembly
For Elections before 1967, please see Jamshedpur Assembly constituency

Election results

2019 Elections

2014 Elections

See also
 Vidhan Sabha
 List of states of India by type of legislature
 Jamshedpur West Assembly constituency
 Jamshedpur Assembly constituency

References

 Schedule – XIII of Constituencies Order, 2008 of Delimitation of Parliamentary and Assembly constituencies Order, 2008 of the Election Commission of India 

Assembly constituencies of Jharkhand
Jamshedpur